The Global Financial Markets Association (GFMA) was created in 2009 to represent the securities and financial markets industry at the international level. It serves as an umbrella group for three regional organizations:
 the Securities Industry and Financial Markets Association (SIFMA), based in New York and Washington DC
 the Association for Financial Markets in Europe (AFME), based in Brussels, Frankfurt and London
 the Asian Securities Industry and Financial Markets Association (ASIFMA), based in Hong Kong. 

The GFMA is one of the main channels of lobbying and advocacy for the financial services industry at the global level. It often takes policy positions together with peers such as the Financial Services Forum, Futures Industry Association, International Securities Lending Association, Bank Policy Institute, International Capital Market Association, Institute of International Finance, and International Swaps and Derivatives Association. Its research is frequently cited in financial services policy debates, even though as a trade body it may not always be viewed as providing a neutral point of view.

The GFMA's secretariat is provided on a rotating basis by the three regional organizations on two-year terms. In March 2022, Chief Executive of the Association for Financial Markets in Europe, became chief executive of GFMA on a two-year term.

See also
 Investment banking
 Broker-dealer
 Stock market

Notes

Finance industry associations
Bankers associations
Lobbying organizations